Amaranthus chihuahuensis is a species of plant also known as Chihuahuan amaranth.  It is not native to the United States.  It is found in Oaxaca and Chihuahua in Mexico.  Some reports have suggested that it is present in lower Texas, but further evidence is necessary.  Its taxonomic identity is considered to be unsure.

References

chihuahuensis
Taxa named by Sereno Watson
Flora of Mexico